Marios Kyriazis (born 11 March 1956) is a medical doctor and gerontologist. He is known for work, publications and involvement with life extension.

Applying the concept of hormesis on anti-ageing medicine, Kyriazis controversially suggested that leading a stressful, irregular and constantly stimulating lifestyle may be a way of reducing the impact of age-related dysfunction.

Medical history

In 1996 Kyriazis founded the Historical Medical Equipment Society, which aims to study old medical instruments related to the history of medicine in the UK. The first public lecture was given at the University of London with support from the Wellcome Trust.  As of July 2018, the society is no longer in existence.

In 2001, in association with the Larnaca Municipality, he organised an exhibition on the medical history in Cyprus with the theme "Medicine in Ancient Kition and Old Larnaca", accompanied by a book on the matter with the same title.

Following the tradition of other benefactors in the family (such as his grandfather Dr Neoclis Kyriazis and his great- uncle Damianos Kyriazis), in 2008 he founded the Kyriazis Medical Museum, a cultural charitable foundation aiming to safe keep old medical items and traditions of Cyprus, and to educate the public on the Cypriot Medical History.

See also
Anti-aging movement
Biological Immortality

References

External links
 The British Longevity Society
 The ELPIs Foundation for Indefinite Lifespans website
 The ELPIs Theory (archived)

1956 births
Living people
University of Perugia alumni
Alumni of King's College London
British geriatricians
Greek Cypriot people
Cypriot expatriates in the United Kingdom
Biogerontologists
Life extensionists
Greek transhumanists
People from Larnaca